Chen Chih-jung (born 24 September 1972) is a Taiwanese former professional tennis player.

Biography
Chen featured in his only ATP Tour main draw in 1992, at his home tournament in Taipei, where he received wildcard entry in both the singles and doubles.

During his career he represented his country in various multi-sport events. He won a mixed doubles gold medal at the 1995 Summer Universiade, held in Fukuoka. At the 1996 Summer Olympics in Atlanta he played in the men's doubles competition with Lien Yu-hui and they were beaten in the first round by the N’Goran brothers from the Ivory Coast. Partnering Lin Bing-chao, he claimed a bronze medal in the men's doubles at the 1998 Asian Games.

In 2000 he played in the last of his 17 Davis Cup ties for Chinese Taipei, finishing with a 19/18 overall record.

References

External links
 
 
 

1972 births
Living people
Taiwanese male tennis players
Olympic tennis players of Taiwan
Tennis players at the 1996 Summer Olympics
Universiade medalists in tennis
Tennis players at the 1994 Asian Games
Tennis players at the 1998 Asian Games
Asian Games medalists in tennis
Asian Games bronze medalists for Chinese Taipei
Medalists at the 1998 Asian Games
Universiade gold medalists for Chinese Taipei
Medalists at the 1995 Summer Universiade
20th-century Taiwanese people